is a city located in Osaka Prefecture, Japan. , the city had an estimated population of 109,479 in 50918 households and a population density of 4100 persons per km². The city is known for its grapes, and also for its large number of ancient kofun burial mounds. The city is also sometimes referred to by its former name .

Geography
Habikino is located in the southeastern part of Osaka Prefecture, in the Kawachi Plain surrounded by Ikoma, Kongō, and Katsuragi Mountains and Mount Nijō. It is within about 20 kilometers from the center of Osaka metropolis.

Neighboring municipalities
Osaka Prefecture
Sakai
Matsubara
Fujiidera
Kashiwara
Tondabayashi
 Taishi
Nara Prefecture
Kashiba

Climate
Habikino has a Humid subtropical climate (Köppen Cfa) characterized by warm summers and cool winters with light to no snowfall.  The average annual temperature in Habikino is 14.2 °C. The average annual rainfall is 1475 mm with September as the wettest month. The temperatures are highest on average in August, at around 26.3 °C, and lowest in January, at around 2.7 °C.

Demographics
Per Japanese census data, the population of Habikino increased rapidly from the 1960s through 1990s, and has leveled off since.

History
The area of the modern city of Habikino was within ancient Kawachi Province and is located on the route of the Take-no-uchi Kaidō, a highway which connected the ancient capitals of Asuka and Heijō-kyō with the coast. Numerous kofun burial mounds were built in the area during the Kofun period, including many attributed to early Emperors. During the Heian period, the area was controlled by the Kawachi Genji clan, the ancestors of the Minamoto clan who dominated Japan during the Kamakura period. 

After the Meiji restoration, the area became part of Osaka Prefecture from 1881. The villages of Furuichi, Imagatani, and Nishiura were created with the establishment of the modern municipalities system on April 1, 1889. On April 1, 1896 the area became part of Minamikawachi District, Osaka. Furuichi was elevated to town status on October 1, 1916. On April 1, 1957, Minami-Osaka annexed the neighboring village of Mihara. On January 15, 1959, Minami-Osaka was elevated to city status, and took the name of Habikino.

Government
Habikino has a mayor-council form of government with a directly elected mayor and a unicameral city council of 18 members. Habikino contributes one member to the Osaka Prefectural Assembly. In terms of national politics, the city is part of Osaka 14th district of the lower house of the Diet of Japan.

Economy
Habikino is a regional commercial center. It was traditionally known for grapes and figs. There is some light manufacturing, but agriculture remains central to the local economy.

Education

Universities and technical schools
Shitennōji International Buddhist University
Osaka Prefecture University Habikino Campus (formerly Osaka Prefecture College of Nursing)

Primary and secondary education
Habikino has 13 public elementary schools, five public middle schools and one combined elementary/middle school operated by the city government and one public high school operated by the Osaka Prefectural Department of Education.

Transportation

Railway
 Kintetsu Railway -    Kintetsu Minami Osaka Line
 (to Osaka Abenobashi) -   -  - <  -   - >   -  -  - (to Kintetsu Gose, Kashiharajingū-mae, Yoshino)

Highway
  Minami-Hanna Road (Habikino Interchange, Habikino-Higashi Interchange)
 
  (Osaka Outer Loop Highway)

Bus
Kintetsu Bus
From Furuichi Station in the east, buses carry passengers on routes to Habikigaoka, Shitennōji International Buddhist University, Momoyama-dai, and Fujiidera Station.
From Eganoshō Station in the west, there is a bus route to Kawachi-Matsubara Station which also covers Mihara-ku in Sakai.
Kongō Bus
Buses pick up passengers at Kaminotaishi Station.

Local attractions
Furuichi Kofun Cluster, a group of Kofun. They are recorded as World Heritage Sites.
Kannonzuka Kofun, National Historic Site 
Honda Shiratori Haniwa Production Site, National Historic Site 
Tsūhō-ji ruins, National Historic Site 
Yachū-ji temple ruins, National Historic Site

Sister city relations

Within Japan
 Kameyama, Mie (friendship city)
 Gose, Nara (friendship city)

Internationally
 Hietzing, Vienna, Austria (sister city)

Notable people from Habikino 
 Makate Asai, writer
 Yu Darvish, baseball player
 Sayuri Uenishi, politician
 Hiroki Uchi, idol singer, songwriter, actor and model

References

External links

 Habikino City official website 

Cities in Osaka Prefecture
Habikino